is the ninth studio album by Japanese idol duo Wink, released by Polystar on November 26, 1992. It features the singles "Furimukanaide" (a cover of The Peanuts' song) and "Real na Yume no Jōken". Also included in the album are Japanese-language covers of Vanessa Williams' "Save the Best for Last", Pat Benatar's Invincible, and Mr. Zivago's "Little Russian".

The album peaked at No. 19 on Oricon's albums chart and sold over 26,000 copies.

Track listing 
All lyrics are written by Neko Oikawa, except where indicated; all music is arranged by Satoshi Kadokura, except where indicated.

Charts

Footnotes

References

External links 
 
 
 

1992 albums
Wink (duo) albums
Japanese-language albums